Patricio Melero Abaroa (born 19 June 1956) is a Chilean politician and agricultural engineer, militant from Unión Demócrata Independiente (UDI), party which he was president.

He was a collaborator of Augusto Pinochet's dictatorship (1973–1990).

On 7 April 2021, he assumed the post of Minister of Labor and Social Provision after being appointed by Sebastián Piñera during his second government (2018–2022), administration where he official and initially he supported as deputy. Thus, Cristián Labbé Martínez replaced him.

References

External links
 

1956 births
Living people
20th-century Chilean politicians
21st-century Chilean politicians
Independent Democratic Union politicians
Members of the Chamber of Deputies of Chile
Mayors of places in Chile
University of Chile alumni
Politicians from Santiago
Government ministers of Chile